Gates Hill is a mountain in Schoharie County, New York. It is located south-southwest of Middleburgh. Armlin Hill is located north and Hony Hill is located north-northeast of Gates Hill.

References

Mountains of Schoharie County, New York
Mountains of New York (state)